Mark Herbert is an English film producer and joint CEO of the Sheffield-based production company Warp Films.

He was born in Doncaster, and studied Film Studies at Sheffield Hallam University between 1991 and 1994.

References

Living people
British film producers
Year of birth missing (living people)
People from Doncaster
Alumni of Sheffield Hallam University